Channelview is a census-designated place (CDP) in the U.S. state of Texas on the east side of Houston in Harris County. Its population was 45,688 at the 2020 U.S. census.

History 
Channelview was given its name since it is located on the northeastern curve of the Houston Ship Channel. The site of Channelview was home to Lorenzo de Zavala, one of the founding fathers of the Republic of Texas. During World War II, the area south of Market to the Ship Channel, and what is now DeZavala St. to the tollway, was part of the U.S. Army San Jacinto Ordnance Depot.

Part of Channelview's sense of community comes from successful athletes, who reflect its positive Texas values.

From Channelview High School came Jalen Hurts, who, coached through high school by his father, Averion Hurts, Sr., and supported by his mother, Pamela Hurts, and his brother, Averion Hurts, Jr., led the Philadelphia Eagles to the 2022-23 Super Bowl. 

Channelview is also home to Houston Astros pitcher Chris Sampson and former outfielder Glenn Wilson. Another famous athlete to come out of Channelview is former Chicago Bears (NFL) wide receiver Johnny Knox. He graduated class of 2005 from Channelview High School.

In 1990, an explosion occurred at the ARCO petrochemical plant in Channelview that killed 17 people and injured five others. Channelview was the site of a notable murder plot occurring in 1991. Wanda Webb Holloway was upset that her daughter, Shanna, had failed two consecutive years to make her junior high school's cheerleading squad.  Holloway came to believe that the fault lay not with Shanna's inability to make the squad, but with Verna Heath, whose daughter, Amber Heath, was a main rival of Shanna's. Holloway asked Terry Harper, her former brother-in-law, to find a hit man to murder Verna Heath, hoping that Amber would be distraught and perform poorly in tryouts, thus allowing Shanna to make the squad.  Harper notified authorities of the plot, though, and an undercover police officer arrested Holloway. Holloway argued that Harper was guilty of entrapment, saying that she never intended anyone to get killed. A jury sentenced Holloway to 15 years for attempted murder. The story was made into a 1993 HBO movie, The Positively True Adventures of the Alleged Texas Cheerleader-Murdering Mom. 
In 1997, Coy Wayne Wesbrook committed mass murder in Channelview, killing five people.

Geography

Demographics

As of the 2020 United States census,  45,688 people, 11,893 households, and 9,752 families were residing in the CDP. As of the census of 2000,  29,685 people, 9,189 households, and 7,369 families lived in the CDP. The population density was 1,831.2 people per square mile (707.1/km2). The 9,874 housing units had an average density of 609.1/sq mi (235.2/km2).

In 2000, the  racial makeup of the CDP was 63.15% White, 13.03% African American, 0.55% Native American, 2.03% Asian, 18.35% from other races, and 2.89% from two or more races. Hispanic or Latino of any race were 37.11% of the population. In 2020, the racial and ethnic makeup grew to a predominant Hispanic or Latino population (71.45%); non-Hispanic whites declined to 13.4% of the population.

Of the 9,189 households in 2000, 48.6% had children under 18 living with them, 60.4% were married couples living together, 13.8% had a female householder with no husband present, and 19.8% were not families. About 15.7% of all households were made up of individuals, and 3.7% had someone living alone who was 65 or older. The average household size was 3.22, and the average family size was 3.60.

In the CDP, the age distribution was 33.7% under 18, 10.6% from 18 to 24, 32.2% from 25 to 44, 18.3% from 45 to 64, and 5.2% who were 65 or older. The median age was 29 years. For every 100 females, there were 100.6 males. For every 100 females 18 and over, there were 97.5 males.

The median income for a household in the CDP was $42,968, and for a family was $45,638 as of 2000. Males had a median income of $35,592 versus $26,423 for females. The per capita income for the CDP was $15,115. About 11.5% of families and 13.7% of the population were below the poverty line, including 17.3% of those under 18 and 15.4% of those 65 or over. By 2020, its median household income increased to $64,045.

Education
Most Channelview CDP residents are served by the Channelview Independent School District, which is headquartered in the CDP. Some residents are served by the Galena Park Independent School District, which is also headquartered in the Channelview CDP.

Channelview ISD operates schools within the CDP. The district has one prekindergarten campus, seven elementary schools (Harvey Brown, Crenshaw, DeZavala, Hamblen, McMullan, Schochler, and Cobb), two junior high schools (Alice Johnson Junior High School, and Anthony Aguirre Junior High School,), L.W. Kolarik 9th Grade Center, and Channelview High School. In addition, CISD operates the Endeavor High School of Choice, an alternative high school.

Sections of Channelview CDP in the Galena Park school district are zoned to schools outside of the Channelview CDP. The sections are divided between the attendance boundaries of  Sam Houston Elementary School, and North Shore Elementary School, which are in the Cloverleaf CDP. All residents are zoned to Cobb Elementary School, North Shore Middle School in the Cloverleaf CDP, and North Shore Senior High School with two campuses in the Cloverleaf CDP.

Residents of both Channelview ISD and Galena Park ISD (and therefore all of Channelview CDP) are zoned to San Jacinto College.

Family Christian Academy and Foundation Christian School are located in Channelview.

Parks and recreation
Harris County Precinct 2 operates the V.V. Ramsey Community Center, the M.L. Flukinger Community Center at 16003 Lorenzo Street, and the Old River Terrace Park on Market St.

Infrastructure
The United States Postal Service operates the Channelview Post Office at 531 Sheldon Road.

The Harris Health System (formerly Harris County Hospital District) designated the Baytown Health Center in southeast Houston for the ZIP code 77530, and the Settegast Health Center for the ZIP code 77015. The designated public hospital is Lyndon B. Johnson General Hospital in northeast Houston.

References

External links

Census-designated places in Harris County, Texas
Census-designated places in Texas
Greater Houston
Populated coastal places in Texas